Showdog Moms & Dads is an American reality television series which premiered on the Bravo cable network on March 30, 2005. The reality series features five pet owners who are involved in show dog hobby. They prepare their dogs for various dog shows around the country, and ultimately meet each other as competitors at National Dog Show in Philadelphia.

The show premiered following the success of another reality series entitled Showbiz Moms & Dads; and Sports Kids Moms & Dads which aired after Showdog Moms & Dads ended.

References

External links 
 
 

2000s American reality television series
2005 American television series debuts
2005 American television series endings
Bravo (American TV network) original programming